Nicholas Heyward (born 20 May 1961) is an English singer-songwriter and guitarist. He came to international attention in the early 1980s as the lead singer and songwriter for Haircut One Hundred. He and the band parted ways after their first album, after which he continued as a solo artist.

Biography

Early life
Born in Beckenham, Heyward spent his early years in and around south London. He attended Kelsey Park School for Boys where he studied art and photography. He left school at 16 to work as a commercial artist.

Haircut One Hundred
Heyward and school friends Graham Jones and Les Nemes, the core of Haircut One Hundred, started bands together as far back as 1977. They were first known as Rugby, then the Boat Party, Captain Pennyworth and Moving England, before settling on Haircut One Hundred. The band signed with Arista Records in 1981 and had four UK top 10 singles between 1981 and 1982. Their debut album, Pelican West (1982), written by Heyward, reached No. 2. It was certified platinum by the British Phonographic Industry.

Work on the band's second album commenced in October 1982 but, in January 1983, a statement was issued confirming that Heyward had left the band, and percussionist Marc Fox had taken over on vocals. At the time of the announcement, Heyward told Smash Hits magazine that he had been contemplating going solo for a while and had already recorded some tracks with session musicians. However, many years later, Heyward stated that he had been struggling with stress and depression at the time after a year of constant work and pressure which led to him being, in effect, sacked by the other members of the band.

Over the years, the band has reformed several times. Though not performing together as of 2017, Heyward described a "deep love" for the band and remarked that "the door is always open". In an interview with Lorraine, he said he was "ever hopeful" that the band would one day play a reunion show at the Roundhouse where Pelican West was recorded.

Solo career
Heyward's solo career began in March 1983 with the single "Whistle Down the Wind", which reached No. 13 on the UK Singles Chart. Two further top 20 hits followed: "Take That Situation" (No. 11) and "Blue Hat for a Blue Day" (No. 14). His debut solo album, North of a Miracle, was released in October 1983 and peaked at No. 10 in the UK. The successive non-album singles, "Love All Day" and "Warning Sign" both went top 40 although a subsequent single "Laura" failed to do so.

Postcards from Home, Heyward's second solo album, was released in 1986, and featured the singles "Over the Weekend" and "Goodbye Yesterday". By 1988, he had moved to Warner Bros. Records and released his third album, I Love You Avenue, which included the single "You're My World".

Heyward's 1993 album, From Monday to Sunday, on Epic Records, featured a more classic rock style, and brought him his first hits of the 1990s. The first single, "Kite", reached No. 44 on the UK Singles Chart and No. 4 on Billboards Hot Modern Rock Tracks chart.

In 1995, Heyward released his second Epic Records album, Tangled, providing him with the UK top 40 single "Rollerblade".

In 1998, Creation Records released The Apple Bed, Heyward's most recent major label release. It featured three singles, "Today", "The Man You Used to Be" and "Stars in Her Eyes".

Since 1998, Heyward has released two independent albums: Open Sesame Seed (2001), a collaboration with British actor/singer Greg Ellis, and featuring Ellis reading Heyward's poetry to the accompaniment of Heyward's musical backing; and The Mermaid and the Lighthouse Keeper (2006), an album of songs recorded with singer/actress India Dupre.

In November 2013, Heyward announced on his website that he was in the process of recording a new album with his son, Oliver. A preview of the album was made available on the site in October 2015. A PledgeMusic campaign to support the album was announced on Heyward's website, on 4 April 2017 and the album title, Woodland Echoes, was released the following day.

Personal life
Heyward married Glaswegian Marion Killen in 1987. They had two children, Oliver and Katie, before divorcing in 2000. In 1998, he had a spiritual awakening that he described as a feeling of complete contentment and a deep connection with nature.

Heyward lives in Stoke Row, South Oxfordshire, and in February 2016 announced his engagement to Sara, his American girlfriend.

Discography

Albums

Singles

"Whistle Down the Wind" additionally charted at No. 20 on the Billboard Adult Contemporary chart.
"Kite" charted at No. 7 on the Billboard Bubbling Under Hot 100 Singles chart.

See also
List of performances on Top of the Pops
List of acts who appeared on American Bandstand
List of Never Mind the Buzzcocks episodes
List of people from Beckenham

References

External links
 Official Nick Heyward website
 

1961 births
Living people
English pop singers
English new wave musicians
English male singer-songwriters
English pop guitarists
English male guitarists
Male new wave singers
People from Beckenham
Haircut One Hundred members
Arista Records artists
Reprise Records artists
Epic Records artists
Creation Records artists
Musicians from Kent
Boogie Box High members